USU linux (Bulgarian: УСУ; Учи Свободен с Убунту) is Bulgarian open source desktop operating system built around the KDE desktop environment and based on the popular free Linux distribution, Ubuntu.

About USU
Usu can be downloaded in three flavours, Desktop, Mini and Netbook, each one with its own features and target audience. All of them can be downloaded for free, as Live CD/DVD ISO images, supporting 32-bit and 64-bit processors. The default language is Bulgarian, but in installation it can be easy changed with F2 key.

Features
USU Desktop is created to be used as a learning tool, this edition of USU includes a very long list of educational apps, like as Celestia space simulator, MuseScore music score typesetter, Blender 3D rendering software, Kalgebra mathematical calculator, and much more.

System Requirements

USU haves this approximate system requirements:

 processor with working frequency ~900 MHz
 minimum 384 MB RAM (512 MB if using as live CD without SWAP)
 ~7 GB free space on hard disk (only in installation choice)
 DVD reader
 monitor, with minimum resolution 640х480, for normal work - 800х600 and up.
 video card, that can show at least 16 bit colors and resolution 640х480 (recommended - 800х600 and up)

Pictures

Usu 9.1

USU 8.1

USU 7

USU 6

USU 5

References

External links

 
 Review in video by the famous Adams family from Australia(OsFirstTimer)

Debian-based distributions
IA-32 Linux distributions
Operating system distributions bootable from read-only media
PowerPC operating systems
 
X86-64 Linux distributions
Linux distributions